Southern Pacific Railroad's AC-5 class of steam locomotives was the railroad's second class of 4-8-8-2 cab forward locomotives.  They were built between July and September 1929 and placed in service soon after construction.  The AC-5 class was only slightly larger than the AC-4 class.

The first locomotive of this class, number 4110, holds the dubious honor of being the first 4-8-8-2 cab forward locomotive to be scrapped when it befell this fate on February 3, 1953, at the railroad's Sacramento, California, shops.  The rest of the class were removed from service and scrapped by mid-1955.  None of this class was preserved.

References 
 

AC-05
4-8-8-2 locomotives
Baldwin locomotives
Simple articulated locomotives
Railway locomotives introduced in 1929
Steam locomotives of the United States
Scrapped locomotives
Standard gauge locomotives of the United States
Freight locomotives 
Cab forward steam locomotives